Tai An Khang (born 26 June 1994) is a Malaysian badminton player. The left handler Tai, started playing badminton at aged 7, and joined the Malaysia national badminton team in 2013. At the Malaysia Purple League he represented Serdang BC in 2014–15, Kepong BC in 2015–16, and Klang City BC in 2016–17 seasons. He won the men's doubles title at the 2012 Smiling Fish International and 2015 Iran Fajr International tournament with different partners.

He is currently a coach in Klang City Badminton Academy which is under the  management of Klang City badminton club.

Achievements

BWF International Challenge/Series (2 titles, 1 runner-up) 
Men's doubles

  BWF International Challenge tournament
  BWF International Series tournament
  BWF Future Series tournament

References

External links 
 

Living people
1994 births
People from Malacca
Malaysian sportspeople of Chinese descent
Malaysian male badminton players
21st-century Malaysian people